Evan Graham Turbott  (27 May 1914 – 12 December 2014) was a New Zealand ornithologist, zoologist, and museum administrator. He served as director of the Auckland Institute and Museum from 1964 to 1979.

Early life and family
Born at Stanley Bay on Auckland's North Shore, Turbott was the eldest of the three sons of Thomas Turbott, a primary school headmaster, and his wife Evangeline Alice Turbott (née Graham). His brothers included the diplomat and businessman Ian Turbott. He was educated at Takapuna Grammar School, and went on to study at Auckland Teachers' Training College and Auckland University College. He graduated from the latter institution with a Master of Science in zoology in 1938.  His thesis was entitled Some observations on the distribution and anatomy of Leiopelma hochstetteri Fitzinger.

On 7 September 1940, Turbott married the ethnologist Olwyn Mary Rutherford at All Saints' Church, Howick.

Career

In 1937 Turbott was appointed as assistant zoologist at Auckland War Memorial Museum. In 1944 he spent a year on coast-watching duties in the subantarctic Auckland Islands as part of the Cape Expedition, which also included Charles Fleming and Robert Falla, but he also found time to pursue his interest in natural history. He later wrote about the experience in the book Year Away: Wartime coast watching on the Auckland Islands, 1944, published in 2002.

Turbott returned and continued at Auckland Museum, until becoming assistant director of Canterbury Museum, Christchurch in 1957. He returned in 1964 to take up the post of director of the Auckland Institute and Museum, succeeding Sir Gilbert Archey. He remained there until he retired in August 1979, when he was named as the museum's director emeritus.

Turbott wrote or co-authored several ornithological works, including New Zealand bird life (1947), Buller's birds of New Zealand (2nd updated edition, 1967, as editor), A field guide to the birds of New Zealand and outlying Islands (1970, with Robert Falla), The new guide to the birds of New Zealand and outlying islands (1979, with Falla), Collins guide to the birds of New Zealand and outlying islands (1981, with Falla), Birds of New Zealand (1990, with Falla), and Checklist of the birds of New Zealand and the Ross Dependency, Antarctica (1990).

A founding member of the Ornithological Society of New Zealand, Turbott served as its president from 1949 to 1952, North Island vice president from 1947 to 1949 and 1957 to 1958, and a councillor between 1953 and 1955.

Turbott died on 12 December 2014.

Honours and awards
In the 1978 New Year Honours, Turbott was appointed a Companion of the Queen's Service Order for public services, in recognition of his role as director of the Auckland Institute and Museum. He was bestowed with the Robert Falla Memorial Award by the Ornithological Society of New Zealand in 1988, and made a fellow of the same organisation in 1997. In 2014, Turbott was the recipient of a lifetime achievement award from Auckland Museum.

Honorific eponynyms
Almost 20 species, mostly invertebrates from New Zealand offshore islands, that were collected by Turbott have been named in his honour, including:
 Anagotus turbotti
 Xenosciomyza turbotti

Lake Turbott, on Adams Island in the Auckland Islands, was also named after Turbott.

Notes

References

1914 births
2014 deaths
People from Auckland
People educated at Takapuna Grammar School
University of Auckland alumni
New Zealand zoologists
Directors of museums in New Zealand
Companions of the Queen's Service Order
New Zealand centenarians
Men centenarians
People associated with the Auckland War Memorial Museum
Directors of the Auckland War Memorial Museum